HMS Portia was a 14-gun Crocus-class brig of the Royal Navy that was launched in 1810. She had a relatively uneventful career before the Navy sold her in 1817 for breaking up.

Career
Commander Joseph Symes commissioned Portia in September 1810 for the North Sea.

In July 1811 Lloyd's List reported that Rebecca, Robloff, master, had arrived at Yarmouth after Portia had detained her. 

Commander Henry Thompson recommissioned her in August 1811. Early in September 1811, Primus, carrying tar and hemp, Worksam, in ballast, Experiment, carrying iron, Columbus, carrying linseed, Neptunus, carrying timber, and Hector, carrying sundry goods, came into Yarmouth.

On 14 August 1812 Portia captured the Dutch schuyt Phoenix.

In August 1813 Lieutenant William Adams took temporary command.

On 27 April 1815 Lieutenant Silas Thomson Hood was promoted to Commander; he commissioned Portia for the Halifax station. On 29 July 1815 Portia captured the sloop Sylph at Bermuda. 

On 1 May 1816 Commander John Wilson was appointed to command of Portia, still on the Halifax Station, to take her back to England.

Portia sailed for England on 16 July 1816 and was paid off in August.

Fate

The "Principal Officers and Commissioners of His Majesty's Navy" offered Portia for sale on 30 January 1817 at Sheerness. She finally sold on 6 March 1817 to Mr. Marclark for £800 for breaking up.

Notes, citations, & references
Notes

Citations

References
 
 
 

1810 ships
Brigs of the Royal Navy